Helen McEntee (born 8 June 1986) is an Irish Fine Gael politician who has served as Minister for Justice from June 2020 to November 2022. From April to November 2021, she became a minister without portfolio during a period of maternity leave. She is now a minister without portfolio for a second time during another period of maternity leave. She has been a Teachta Dála (TD) for the Meath East constituency since 2013. She previously served as Minister of State for European Affairs from 2017 to 2020 and Minister of State for Mental Health and Older People from 2016 to 2017.

The daughter of Shane McEntee, who was a Fine Gael politician and TD from 2005 to 2012, she was raised in Meath and studied at Dublin City University. After taking a job in industry, she worked at Leinster House as her father's assistant from 2010, until his death in 2012. She was first elected as a TD at the 2013 Meath East by-election, triggered by the death of her father, and she became the first Fine Gael candidate since 1975 to win a by-election with the party in government. She was re-elected to represent the constituency in 2016, and subsequently appointed as a Minister of State at the Department of Health. She was also chair of the government's youth mental health task force, an organisation that works to increase awareness of mental health issues among young people.

In June 2020, Helen McEntee was appointed as Minister for Justice in a coalition government of Fianna Fáil, Fine Gael and the Green Party.

Early life and career
The daughter of Shane and Kathleen McEntee, Helen McEntee is one of four siblings. She is also the niece of former Gaelic footballer and prominent surgeon Gerry McEntee. Raised on her family's farm in Castletown, County Meath, she attended St Joseph's Mercy Secondary School in Navan, where she first developed an interest in politics, and represented her class on the school's student council. From 2004, she studied economics, politics, and law at Dublin City University (DCU), where she helped to re-establish the university's branch of Young Fine Gael, which had been inactive for some time. After graduating in 2007, she worked for a subsidiary of Citibank, but returned to higher education in 2010, to complete a master's degree in Journalism and Media Communications at Griffith College.

Her father was first elected to Dáil Éireann as a Fine Gael TD at the 2005 Meath by-election, winning the seat vacated by the resignation of former Taoiseach John Bruton, and was a popular figure with constituents. McEntee began to work in Leinster House as her father's personal assistant in May 2010, while he was an opposition TD. One of the first issues on which she worked with her father was a campaign on behalf of the owners of several thousand houses damaged by the use of pyrite, a material used as backfill during construction, that expands when damp or exposed to air. She considered standing as a candidate in the 2014 local elections, and discussed the prospect with her father, as well as the possibility of one day succeeding him as a member of the Dáil. She moved with him to the Department of Agriculture, Food and the Marine when he was appointed Minister of State after Fine Gael became a party of government following the 2011 general election.

Shane McEntee died by suicide on 21 December 2012, his death triggering a by-election. His brother, Gerry blamed cyberbullying through social media as a contributing factor in his suicide, and opposition politicians who had criticised him for comments he made about grant cuts to respite care. Fine Gael politician John Farrelly also suggested online abuse as a possible cause, but Helen McEntee has rejected this theory, since she had managed her father's social media presence and was not aware of any issues. Speaking to The Sunday Independent during her campaign to succeed her father as a TD, she said that she did not believe he had intended to kill himself, and that she did not think he was depressed. In 2016, she said that she believes her father was "overworked and stressed. In a very short space of time, things went downhill."

Political career

2013 Meath East by-election, and 31st Dáil
McEntee was selected to stand as the Fine Gael candidate in the Meath East by-election during a party convention held at the Headfort Arms Hotel in Kells on 7 March 2013. She was the only nominee whose name went forward to contest the seat, and the only woman among eleven candidates in the by-election itself. During her campaign, McEntee expressed her wish to continue her father's work while seeking to be "a young fresh voice", and focused on issues such as emigration, employment, and supporting local business. She was joined on the campaign trail by Taoiseach Enda Kenny, who was confronted at a supermarket in Ratoath by an officer of the Garda Síochána angered at having to accept a pay cut because of austerity measures introduced by the government. McEntee participated in a televised debate on RTÉ One's Primetime on 25 March, along with Fianna Fáil candidate Thomas Byrne, Labour's Eoin Holmes, and Sinn Féin's Darren O'Rourke.

She was subsequently elected to Dáil Éireann in the by-election held on 27 March 2013, defeating Byrne (previously a TD for the constituency) with 9,356 first preference votes compared to 8,002 for Byrne. In retaining the seat for Fine Gael she became the first candidate to win a by-election for the party while in government since Taoiseach Kenny succeeded his father as a TD in 1975. McEntee became the second youngest TD (after Simon Harris) and the youngest female TD in the 31st Dáil. During the election campaign, Seamus Morris, a Sinn Féin North Tipperary County Councillor, accused the McEntee family of putting their grief to one side to keep their "snouts in the trough". Morris posted the comments on Facebook, but later withdrew them when they were published on the front page of the Irish Daily Mail, and issued an apology; Sinn Féin President Gerry Adams called the remarks "entirely inappropriate".

McEntee took her seat in the Dáil on 16 April 2013, where she received a standing ovation upon entering the debating chamber, and was welcomed by Taoiseach Kenny, as well as other political leaders. She described taking up the seat vacated by her father as "a huge honour", and said that it was an "emotional day for all the McEntee family". The Irish Independent later reported that she had "impressed many...[by her] manner and choice of words to the media as she arrived at Leinster House. 'I drove down to the graveside this morning and had a few words. I think he [her father] called into Michael Collins the morning of his first day, so I called into my hero.'" McEntee gave her maiden speech to the Dáil on 8 May 2013, during a debate about that year's fodder shortage caused by cold spring weather, praising Agriculture Minister Simon Coveney's handling of the issue. She was subsequently appointed to the Oireachtas Committee on Transport and Communications, and the Oireachtas Committee on Environment, Culture and the Gaeltacht.

She spent much of her first term focusing on constituency issues, among them championing the 2013 Pyrite Resolution Act, a €50m compensation scheme for homes affected by the use of pyrite in their construction. She also secured funding for the Slane bypass, as well as increased funding for schools and local community sports projects. In addition, McEntee campaigned for improvements to mobile broadband coverage in Meath, and was a vocal supporter of the local agricultural industry. She campaigned for a yes vote in the 2015 referendum concerning the legalisation of same-sex marriage in the Republic of Ireland, and voted in favour of the proposed abolition of Seanad Éireann, the upper house of the Irish parliament. Following a random audit of 22 members of the Oireachtas in 2014, she was one of five politicians required to repay expenses they had claimed that had been declared ineligible. She described the episode, which resulted in her having to repay €1,675.88 of expenses, as being a result of "human error".

2016 general election, and 32nd Dáil
McEntee contested the Meath East constituency in the 2016 general election, where she was one of two sitting Fine Gael deputies defending Dáil seats. Elaine Loughlin of the Irish Examiner noted that despite her relatively short time representing the constituency, McEntee had been "visible on the ground, attending community meetings and events", and suggested she would benefit from this at the forthcoming poll, particularly as she had enjoyed a greater presence than her colleagues. Newstalk radio presenter Ivan Yates forecast a win for Fianna Fáil in an area that falls into the Dublin commuter belt, but felt that McEntee would hold on to her seat because she is from the largely rural north of the constituency.

McEntee was re-elected to represent Meath East at the election, held on 26 February. She secured a seat in the Dáil on the eighth count, despite not reaching the 50% quota required under STV rules.

In the aftermath of an election that had produced no overall winner, and as Fine Gael parliamentary party secretary, McEntee voiced her support for a proposed Fine Gael–Fianna Fáil coalition, which had been put forward by Kenny and other senior party figures. The move was backed by Fine Gael's backbench TDs at a meeting on 7 April, but rejected by Fianna Fáil. McEntee described the proposal as "an historic offer, representing seismic change in the political landscape". She also participated in an internal party inquiry into Fine Gael's poor election performance, as part of a team of TDs who spoke to unsuccessful candidates, but stood down from this position upon her appointment as a junior minister.

Minister of State for Mental Health and Older People
Kenny formed a minority government after securing the support of several Independent TDs, and on 19 May 2016, appointed McEntee as Minister of State at the Department of Health with responsibility for Mental Health and Older People.

One of her first acts in the post was to help launch an Irish Council for Civil Liberties booklet offering advice to older people on their rights concerning retirement, access to health and community care, pensions, and elder abuse. Shortly after this, she was faced with one of her first major tasks when she was called on to play a role in helping to wind up the affairs of Console, a suicide bereavement counselling charity, after the organisation was plunged into crisis by a scandal involving the misuse of funds. McEntee worked with the charity's chief executive to ensure the services it provided would continue to be available. Console's functions were taken over by Pieta House in July 2016.

On 2 June, and in response to a question from Fianna Fáil's James Browne about government spending on mental health, McEntee told the Dáil the government was committed to an annual increase in funding; Browne had noted that in 2014, €20 million had been allocated to mental health services rather than the promised €35 million, but McEntee said that €35 million had been ringfenced for 2016 and 2017. Along with Minister for Health Simon Harris, McEntee argued for the restoration of €12 million originally ringfenced for mental health spending that had been diverted to other areas. On 8 June, and as part of a €480m bailout package for health, the government announced that the mental health funding would be restored. Welcoming the decision, McEntee said the money would be used for staff recruitment and to improve services for homeless people, as well as developing perinatal mental health services.

On 28 July 2016, the government approved the establishment of a youth mental health task force, a body seeking to increase the awareness of mental health issues among children and young people. On 4 August, McEntee announced the make-up of the committee, to be chaired by herself, which would include people from professions such as politics, health, mental health, charities, and sport. She also announced the establishment of a Young Persons’ Reference Group, co-chaired by singer Niall Breslin and mental health adviser Emma Farrell. Speaking about the initiative, McEntee said that its work would "ensure that the voices of our young people are at the core of a more open, more engaging, more supportive national conversation about mental health and wellbeing". The National Taskforce on Youth Mental Health had its inaugural meeting in September.

Minister of State for European Affairs

After Leo Varadkar succeeded Enda Kenny as Taoiseach in June 2017, McEntee was appointed by the new government as Minister of State for European Affairs on 20 June, a role that involved negotiations with the United Kingdom in its continuing Brexit process. Shortly after taking up the position, she travelled with Varadkar to Brussels for a European Council meeting, which included talks with German Chancellor Angela Merkel and her team. In September 2017, she addressed a conference at Dublin City University to mark the foundation of the university's Brexit Institute.

In January 2019, Helen McEntee told the BBC the Irish backstop was absolutely necessary, because of the UK's red lines on leaving the European single market and European customs union, to avoid a hard Border and protect the Northern Ireland peace process. She called on the UK to live up to its obligations of the Good Friday Agreement.

McEntee was elected as vice-president of the European People's Party (EPP) in November 2019, at the party's Congress in Zagreb.

Minister for Justice
At the general election in February 2020, McEntee was re-elected in Meath East, taking the second seat after winning 18% of the first preference votes. The constituency had been seen as a challenge for Fine Gael, with two TDs (both ministers) trying to hold their seats in a 3-seat constituency as Fine Gael's support dipped. McEntee's colleague Regina Doherty TD lost her seat to Darren O'Rourke of Sinn Féin.

On the election of Micheál Martin as Taoiseach in June 2020, McEntee became Minister for Justice as part of a coalition government composed of Fianna Fáil, Fine Gael and the Green Party. She is the fourth female Minister for Justice in the history of the State.

As Minister for Justice, McEntee oversaw the passage of the Harassment, Harmful Communications and Related Offences Act 2020, which had been introduced in 2017 as a private member's bill by Labour leader Brendan Howlin, following the death of a 21-year-old girl who took her own life after she was bullied on social media. The act makes online harassment and the sharing of personal, intimate images (including revenge porn) a criminal offence.

In December 2020, McEntee announced the government's plans to introduce hate speech legislation in Ireland.

On 27 April 2021, the Department of Justice was reassigned to Heather Humphreys as McEntee began a period of six months' maternity leave. McEntee remained as a minister without portfolio and was reassigned to the Department of Justice on 1 November 2021. On 25 November 2022, Heather Humphreys was again appointed as Minister for Justice to facilitate a second period of six months' maternity leave from December.

Politics and views
McEntee has sought to raise awareness of suicide-related issues since her father's death, and in 2013 joined the launch of a suicide prevention campaign by the Pieta House charity, aimed at educating rural communities about the early warning signs of suicide. She also took part in a sponsored walk from Dublin to Navan for the See the Light campaign, which seeks to raise awareness of mental health issues. However, she told the Irish Independent that she does not want the focus to be on her father's death every time she attends a suicide prevention event.

Following the publication of a 2016 interdepartmental report into the issue of mental health in the justice system, McEntee stated her belief that it is unacceptable to send people with mental health issues to prison, and that this is an issue that must be tackled by the government. She also believes the government should address concerns about the mental health of unemployed young people.

During the 2016 general election campaign, McEntee expressed concern that the area around the Newgrange monument, which is in her constituency, risks becoming a "dead zone" due to restricted planning regulations in the vicinity which often prevents the building of new homes and facilities. She supports the teaching of politics in schools, as well as lowering the voting age to 16. She also believes more women should be encouraged to go into politics, and as a minister has spoken of her support for the idea of gender quotas as a way of increasing the number of female politicians. She favours the option of extending the Fair Deal scheme to include home care. Michael Brennan, of the Irish Independent has described McEntee's support of small food business as "one of the brightest stories to come out of the recession". On the UK's Brexit process, McEntee has spoken of the importance of building certainty between the UK and EU: "We must deal with the past and lay the foundations of a trusting relationship before we can build the future".

McEntee supported and campaigned for the introduction of same-sex marriage in Ireland in 2015, calling the referendum "an opportunity to show the world that we treat all our citizens as equals". She also supported the repeal of the Eighth Amendment to the  Constitution, which legalised abortion in Ireland.

Personal life
McEntee is married to Paul Hickey, who she first met while he was working at Dáil Éireann as a parliamentary assistant to fellow Fine Gael politician Joe McHugh. Hickey proposed to McEntee in January 2016, and the couple were married at St Patrick's Church, Castletown, on 7 August 2017.

On 5 December 2020, McEntee announced that she and her husband were expecting their first child. This led to discussions around the lack of parental leave for Irish politicians.

She gave birth to a boy in April 2021, making her the first Irish cabinet minister to give birth while in office.

On 20 June 2022, McEntee announced that she and her husband were expecting their second child. She gave birth to a boy in December 2022.

See also
Families in the Oireachtas

References

External links

Helen McEntee's page on the Fine Gael website

1986 births
Living people
21st-century women Teachtaí Dála
Alumni of Dublin City University
Alumni of Griffith College
Female justice ministers
Fine Gael TDs
Helen
Members of the 31st Dáil
Members of the 32nd Dáil
Members of the 33rd Dáil
Ministers for Justice (Ireland)
Ministers of State of the 32nd Dáil
Politicians from County Meath
Women ministers of state of the Republic of Ireland
Women government ministers of the Republic of Ireland